Virinchipuram is a state assembly constituency in Vellore district, Tamil Nadu, India. It exists from 1962 to 1971.

Madras state

Election results

1962

References

External links
 

Vellore district
Former assembly constituencies of Tamil Nadu